Thomas Newby Braxtan House, also known as the Braxtan Inn, is a historic home located at Paoli, Orange County, Indiana.  It was built in 1893, and is a -story, Queen Anne style frame dwelling. It sits on a sandstone foundation and has a semi-octagonal gabled projection. It features wooden ornamentation including fishscale shingles, fan-shaped corner braces, and turned posts on the rear porch. The house was first used as a hotel / boarding house in 1924, and continues as a bed and breakfast.

It was listed on the National Register of Historic Places in 1989.

References

Bed and breakfasts in Indiana
Houses on the National Register of Historic Places in Indiana
Queen Anne architecture in Indiana
Houses completed in 1893
Houses in Orange County, Indiana
National Register of Historic Places in Orange County, Indiana
Individually listed contributing properties to historic districts on the National Register in Indiana